Jandyan Waterfall is located in the Kurdistan Region in Iraq.

References

Waterfalls of Iraq
Erbil Governorate
Tourist attractions in Iraqi Kurdistan